When we sleep, our breathing changes due to normal biological processes that affect both our respiratory and muscular systems.

Physiology

Sleep Onset
Breathing changes as we transition from wakefulness to sleep. These changes arise due to biological changes in the processes that regulate our breathing. When we fall asleep, minute ventilation (the amount of air that we breathe per minute) reduces due to decreased metabolism.

Non-REM (NREM) Sleep
During NREM sleep, we move through three sleep stages, with each progressively deeper than the last. As our sleep deepens, our minute ventilation continues to decrease, reducing by 13% in the second NREM stage and by 15% in the third. For example, a study of 19 healthy adults revealed that the minute ventilation in NREM sleep was 7.18 liters/minute compared to 7.66 liters/minute when awake.

Ribcage & Abdominal Muscle Contributions
Rib cage contribution to ventilation increases during NREM sleep, mostly by lateral movement, and is detected by an increase in EMG amplitude during breathing. Diaphragm activity is little increased or unchanged and abdominal muscle activity is slightly increased during these sleep stages.

Upper Airway Resistance
Airway resistance increases by about 230% during NREM sleep. Elastic and flow resistive properties of the lung do not change during NREM sleep. The increase in resistance comes primarily from the upper airway in the retro-epiglottic region. Tonic activity of the pharyngeal dilator muscles of the upper airway decreases during the NREM sleep, contributing to the increased resistance, which is reflected in increased esophageal pressure swings during sleep. The other ventilatory muscles compensate for the increased resistance, and so the airflow decreases much less than the increase in resistance.

Arterial Blood Gases
The Arterial blood gasses pCO2 increases by 3-7mmHg, pO2 drops by 3-9mmHg and SaO2 drops by 2% or less. These changes occur despite a reduced metabolic rate, reflected by a 10-20% decrease in O2 consumption, suggesting overall hypoventilation instead of decreased production/metabolism.

Pulmonary Arterial Pressure
Periodic oscillations of the pulmonary arterial pressure occur with respiration. Pulmonary arterial systolic and diastolic pressure and PAD increase by 4-5mm in NREM sleep

Effects Of Arousals
Induced transient arousal from NREM sleep cause the following:
Increase EMG activity of the diaphragm 150%, increased activity of upper airway dilating muscles 250%, increased airflow and tidal volume 160% and decreased upper airway resistance.

Steady REM Sleep

Ventilation
Irregular breathing with sudden changes in both amplitude and frequency at times interrupted by central apneas lasting 10–30 seconds are noted in Rapid Eye Movement (REM) sleep. (These are physiologic changes and are different from abnormal breathing patterns noted in sleep disordered breathing). These breathing irregularities are not random, but correspond to bursts of eye movements. This breathing pattern is not controlled by the chemoreceptors, but is due to the activation of behavioral respiratory control system by REM sleep processes. Quantitative measure of airflow is quite variable in this sleep stage and has been shown to be increased, decreased or unchanged. Tidal volume has also been shown to be increased, decreased or unchanged by quantitative measures in REM sleep. So breathing during REM sleep is somewhat discordant.

In a study of 19 healthy adults, the minute ventilation in REM sleep was 6.46 +/- 0.29(SEM) liters/minute compared to 7.66 +/- 0.34 liters/minute when awake.

Ribcage & Abdominal Muscle Contributions
Intercostal muscle activity decreases in REM sleep and contribution of rib cage to respiration decreases during REM sleep. This is due to REM related supraspinal inhibition of alpha motoneuron drive and specific depression of fusimotor function. Diaphraghmatic activity correspondingly increases during REM sleep. Although paradoxical thoracoabdominal movements are not observed, the thoracic and abdominal displacements are not exactly in phase. This decrease in intercostal muscle activity is primarily responsible for hypoventilation that occurs in patients with borderline pulmonary function.

Upper Airway Function
Upper airway resistance is expected to be highest during REM sleep because of atonia of the pharyngeal dilator muscles and partial airway collapse. Many studies have shown this, but not all. Some have shown unchanged airway resistance during REM sleep, others have shown it to increase to NREM levels.

Arterial Blood Gases
Hypoxemia due to hypoventilation is noted in REM sleep but this is less well studied than NREM sleep. These changes are equal to or greater than NREM sleep

Pulmonary Arterial Pressure
Pulmonary arterial pressure fluctuates with respiration and rises during REM sleep.

Effect of Arousals
Arousals cause return of airway resistance and airflow to near awake values. Refer arousals in NREM sleep.

Sleep and Breathing in High Altitudes 
At a lower altitude, the link between breathing and sleep has been established. At a higher altitude, disruptions in sleep are often linked to changes in the respiratory (breathing ) rhythm. Changes in altitude cause variations in sleep time (reduced to 0% up to 93%), as shown in a study that examined people at sea level and Pikes Peak (4300 meters). These subjects also experienced more frequent arousals and diminished stage 3 and stage 4 sleep. A poorer quality of sleep was indicated, but not due to less sleep time, but more frequent awakenings during the night. Practice of simple breathing & breath manipulation techniques like Kumbhaka & Rechaka or Shunyaka can drastically reduce the amount of oxygen required to stay in normal state in high altitudes even during sleep.

Sleep-disordered breathing (abnormal sleep and breathing or sleep-related breathing disorders)

Primary snoring
Snoring is a condition characterized by noisy breathing during sleep. Usually, any medical condition where the airway is blocked during sleeping, like obstructive sleep apnea, may give rise to snoring. Snoring, when not associated with an obstructive phenomenon is known as primary snoring. Apart from the specific condition of obstructive sleep apnea, other causes of snoring include alcohol intake prior to sleeping, stuffy nose, sinusitis, obesity, long tongue or uvula, large tonsil or adenoid, smaller lower jaw, deviated nasal septum, asthma, smoking and sleeping on one's back. Primary snoring is also known as "simple" or "benign" snoring, and is not associated with sleep apnea.

Upper airway resistance syndrome

Obstructive sleep apnea (including hypopnea) syndrome

Obstructive sleep apnea is apnea either as the result of obstruction of the air passages or inadequate respiratory muscle activity.

Central sleep apnea syndrome

Sleep apnea (or sleep apnoea in British English; /æpˈniːə/) is a sleep disorder characterized by pauses in breathing or instances of shallow or infrequent breathing during sleep. Each pause in breathing, called an apnea, can last for several seconds to several minutes, and may occur 5 to 30 times or more in an hour.

Complex sleep disordered syndrome

Sleep related hypoventilation syndromes

References

Sleep physiology